World Nomad Games are an international sport competition dedicated to ethnic sports practiced in Central Asia. The first three World Nomad Games were held in Cholpon-Ata, Kyrgyzstan. The fourth games were held in Iznik, Turkey between September 29th and October 2nd 2022. More than 3000 athletes from 102 countries participated in the events.

Sports and disciplines
 Alysh, a kind of belt wrestling,
 Salburun, a sport mixing falconry, mounted archery and hunt assisted by Taigan,
 Shagai,
 Kourach,
Kok-boru, a sport similar to Buzkashi, where riders fight for a goat carcass.; also called Kokpar in Kazakhstan.
 Mangala, a Turkish Mancala game, as well as other national variants

A cultural program 

The Games are surrounded by a cultural and ethnical program. During the first edition of the Games, a yurt village was installed, and cultural events not linked with the Games' disciplines occurred, as well as other entertaining activities.

List of Nomad Games 
Source:

 2020 Event delayed until 2022 as a result of the COVID-19 pandemic

 2022 first planned in 40 sports but was competed in 13 sports + 8 exhibition sports.

Medals (2014-2018)

See also
 Nomad

References

External links
Official website of the 2022 Games
Official website of the 2018 Games 
Official promotional video, 2016 games, Bishkek, Kyrgyzstan
World Nomad Games 2018 Kyrgyzstan
Official Youtube channel
List of sports and disciplines
CBS Sports on The World Nomad Games
 The Guardian
DW News

 
Multi-sport events
Nomads